Matthew "Matt" Doust (1984 – 28 August 2013) was an internationally renowned American-born Australian hyper-realistic artist who was a finalist in the 2011 Archibald Prize, for his work on a portrait Australian actress and fashion model Gemma Ward.

Doust was born in Santa Monica, California in 1984. He grew up in Perth, Western Australia.

Doust died from an epileptic seizure on 28 August 2013, aged 29, in Los Angeles, California, where he had lived since July 2011.

Works

Painted the album cover used by Deap Vally on the album Sistrionix.

References

1984 births
2013 deaths
Australian painters
People from Santa Monica, California
Artists from Perth, Western Australia
Painters from California
Neurological disease deaths in California
Deaths from epilepsy